Muriel Gustavo Becker (born 14 February 1987), simply known as Muriel, is a Brazilian footballer who plays as a goalkeeper for Cypriot Club AEL Limassol.

Career

Internacional
In 2009, Muriel was loaned by Internacional to Caxias and Portuguesa. He won the 2010 Copa FGF with the Internacional B side.

On 23 May 2011, he joined Série B club Portuguesa for a second loan spell, but the contract was rescinded.

In July 2016, he was loaned to another second-tier team, Bahia.

Belenenses / Belenenses SAD
On 13 June 2017, Muriel moved abroad for the first time, signing for C.F. Os Belenenses of the Portuguese Primeira Liga on a two-year deal. Sixteen days later he made his debut in the first round of the Taça da Liga in a 1–0 home loss to Real SC, though the result was revoked in his team's favour as the opponents had fielded the suspended Abou Touré. In his first league game, the side from Lisbon lost by the same score at Rio Ave F.C. on 7 August.

In Muriel's second season in Belém, with the team now spun off as Belenenses SAD, he was an ever-present for the first 32 league matches, including a 2–0 home win over eventual champions S.L. Benfica on 27 October 2018. In his final game for the club on 5 May 2019, he gifted city rivals Sporting CP the opening goal by giving the ball to Raphinha, he then fouled the same played in the 21st minute and was sent off in an 8–1 loss.

Fluminense
On 5 July 2019, Muriel returned to Brazil's top flight, signing a 3 and a half year deal with Fluminense. He made his debut on 24 July in the last 16 first leg of the 2019 Copa Sudamericana, a 2–1 win away to Peñarol. Four days later, in his first Série A match for the club, he made an error in a 2–1 home loss to São Paulo at the Maracanã Stadium.

In his debut Campeonato Carioca season, Becker reached the final with Fluminense, losing 3–1 on aggregate to rivals Flamengo in July 2020.

Style of play
Becker is known for his speed and timing when rushing off his line.

Personal life
Muriel's younger brother, Alisson Becker, is also a professional footballer and a goalkeeper for Premier League club Liverpool and the Brazil national team. He was his teammate at Internacional.

Career statistics

Club

References

External links

 

1987 births
Living people
People from Novo Hamburgo
Brazilian people of German descent
Brazilian footballers
Brazilian expatriate footballers
Expatriate footballers in Portugal
Expatriate footballers in Cyprus
Brazilian expatriate sportspeople in Portugal
Brazilian expatriate sportspeople in Cyprus
Association football goalkeepers
Campeonato Brasileiro Série A players
Campeonato Brasileiro Série B players
Campeonato Brasileiro Série C players
Primeira Liga players
Cypriot First Division players
Sport Club Internacional players
Sociedade Esportiva e Recreativa Caxias do Sul players
Associação Portuguesa de Desportos players
Esporte Clube Bahia players
C.F. Os Belenenses players
Belenenses SAD players
Fluminense FC players
AEL Limassol players
Brazil youth international footballers
Brazil under-20 international footballers
Sportspeople from Rio Grande do Sul